Herendeen Bay is a populated place in the Aleutians East Borough of Alaska.

Demographics

Herendeen Bay first appeared on the 1890 U.S. Census as Herendeen Bay Coal Mine, but was reported under "Ozernoi", which had a total of 45 residents and did not report a separate figure. It next appeared as Herendeen in 1920 and in 1940 as Herendeen Bay. It has not reported again since and is considered a ghost.

References

Populated coastal places in Alaska on the Pacific Ocean
Populated places in Aleutians East Borough, Alaska
Road-inaccessible communities of Alaska